Le prisonnier du Bouddha, written by Franquin and Greg, drawn by Franquin with assistance by Jidéhem, is the fourteenth album of the Spirou et Fantasio series. The story was initially serialised in Spirou magazine before its release as a hardcover album in 1960.

Story
In The Prisoner of the Buddha, Spirou and Fantasio arrive in Champignac to find great changes in the Count's mansion park. A Russian scientist, Nicolas Inovskyev, the co-inventor of a revolutionary and powerful device named the G.A.G., is in hiding fearing the same fate as his American partner Harold W. Longplaying. Longplaying has been kidnapped by the Chinese army, who want his technology, and is being held captive in one of a series of giant statues of the Buddha which line up a valley. Armed with the new invention, the heroes set out to rescue the prisoner, and save the world.

Background
Featured in this album are two seemingly British, twin-like and awkward investigators, in what may be an homage to Hergé's The Adventures of Tintin characters, Dupont et Dupond (Thomson and Thompson).

References

 Franquin publications in Spirou BDoubliées

External links
 Spirou official site album index 
 Franquin site album index 

Comics by André Franquin
Spirou et Fantasio albums
1960 graphic novels
1960 in comics
Comics set in China
Works originally published in Spirou (magazine)
Literature first published in serial form